The Big Ten Football Championship Game is a college football game held by the Big Ten Conference each year to determine the conference's season champion. The game, held after the regular season has been completed, matches the division champions from the conference's West and East divisions. It is typically held the first Saturday of December, although in 2020 it was played on the third Saturday of December due to the Covid-19 pandemic. Lucas Oil Stadium in Indianapolis has been the site of the championship game since its inception in 2011 and is scheduled to host through 2021. Since 2017, the game's official title has been the "Big Ten College Football Championship Game Presented by Discover" following a sponsorship deal with Discover Financial. 

The winner of this game earns the Big Ten's automatic berth in the Rose Bowl Game, unless the team is selected to play in the four-team College Football Playoff and/or the Rose Bowl is one of the playoff semi-finals. The winning team also receives the Stagg Championship Trophy, while the most valuable player of the game receives the Grange–Griffin Championship Game Most Valuable Player Trophy. Through the 2021 game, Wisconsin and Ohio State have the most appearances in the game with six, while Ohio State has the most wins with five.

History

Prior to the 2011 college football season, the Big Ten Conference determined its conference representative  through regular season play, and, as there were only 11 member schools, there was no possibility for a conference championship game because, at the time, the NCAA required that a conference have 12 teams with two divisions in order to hold a conference championship game.

In 2010, the Big Ten Conference added the University of Nebraska, bringing the membership total to 12 teams. Thus, the conference was able to meet NCAA requirements. On August 5, 2010, Big Ten Conference Commissioner James Delany  announced that Lucas Oil Stadium in Indianapolis had been chosen as the possible site for the inaugural championship game. The league office began a 30-day period to negotiate a one-year agreement with Indiana Sports Corp and Lucas Oil Stadium to host the game. Delany also announced that once the 2011 agreement was in place, the conference office would conduct a thorough process over the next year to determine the location of the Big Ten Football Championship Game in 2012 and beyond.

On November 17, 2010, the Big Ten Conference announced a media agreement with Fox Sports to serve as the official broadcast partner for the 2011–2016 Big Ten Football Championship Games. A source at the time stated that the six-year agreement with Fox Sports would be worth between $20–$25 million per season, making it one of the most valuable conference championship games in college football. In the league's press release, it was confirmed that the 2011 event would take place at Lucas Oil Stadium in prime time. Because Fox is a majority partner in the Big Ten Network, this may allow for the possibility of more involvement by the Big Ten Network in the event, including the use of Big Ten Network staff in the game coverage. Commissioner Delany also stated at that time that the Big Ten would strongly consider rotating the site of the game, mentioning other possible host cities such as Chicago, Detroit, Minneapolis, Green Bay, and Cleveland.

On June 5, 2014, the Big Ten Conference announced via press release that the Big Ten Football Championship game would continue to be held at Lucas Oil Stadium through the 2021 season. No team from the West Division has ever defeated an East Division team in the conference championship game.

Conference expansion

The Big Ten expanded to 11 schools by adding Penn State in 1990, but this did not yet meet the NCAA's requirements for holding a conference championship game (that the conference have 12 teams with two divisions). A few other times during that period, there were talks between the Big Ten and other schools (namely, Kansas, Missouri, and Rutgers, and later Notre Dame) which might have led to the possibility of a conference with two divisions of at least six teams and a conference championship, but for various reasons, nothing came to fruition.

It was not until December 2009, when Commissioner Delany announced that the league would explore the possibility of adding one or more institutions, that the wheels were set in motion that would lead to the Big Ten adding a school for the first time in 20 years. Less than a year later, on June 11, 2010, Nebraska applied for membership and was unanimously accepted by the conference's 11 member schools. Its membership became effective on July 1, 2011.

In November 2012, the Big Ten announced that Maryland and Rutgers would join the conference in 2014, which brought conference membership up to 14 schools.

Team selection

The two participating teams in the game are the first place teams from each of the conference's two divisions.

After the addition of Nebraska to the conference, there was much debate over what would be the best division of the 12 schools. Some felt that it would be best to maintain geographical divisions. Others felt that geography should only be a factor insofar as there was competitive balance between the two divisions. Another very important factor for Big Ten schools was the maintenance of long-standing rivalries that the schools held with each other.

On September 1, 2010, Commissioner Delany revealed how the teams would be placed into the two divisions. On December 13,  Commissioner Delany announced that the two divisions would be called Legends and Leaders. The scheduling arrangement for the schools was that they would face each of the other schools in their division, plus three crossover opponents, one of which would be permanent. The permanent crossover opponent would be used to ensure that long standing historical rivalries would continue.

On August 4, 2011, the Big Ten Conference announced that there would be a nine-game conference schedule beginning in 2017, allowing schools to play four crossover opponents. However, the Big Ten and Pac-12 later announced a multi-sport scheduling agreement that provides for each member school to play one non-conference football game per year against an opponent from the other conference, and with this announcement, the Big Ten backed away from the nine-game conference schedule proposal.

Following the 2014 entry of Maryland and Rutgers, the "Leaders" and "Legends" divisions were set aside and replaced by geographic divisions, with the schools in the Central Time Zone plus Purdue forming the new West Division, and the remaining members forming the East Division. In addition, the conference adopted a nine-game schedule beginning in 2016.

In December 2020, the Big Ten Conference waived the six-game minimum requirement for a team to participate in the championship game; Ohio State, which had a 5–0 record after playing a limited schedule impacted by the COVID-19 pandemic in the United States, would otherwise have been ineligible to participate. The Big Ten stated, "The decision was based on a competitive analysis which determined that Ohio State would have advanced to the Big Ten Football Championship Game based on its undefeated record and head-to-head victory over Indiana regardless of a win or loss against Michigan."

Results 

 2011–2013 rankings from the AP Poll released prior to the game.  
 2014–present rankings from College Football Playoff Poll released prior to the game.
 2020 game attendance capped due to the COVID-19 pandemic.

Common matchups
Matchups that have occurred more than once:

Results by team

Illinois, Indiana, Maryland, Minnesota and Rutgers have yet to make an appearance in a Big Ten Football Championship Game.

Media coverage

Television

Radio

Game records

Source:

Selection criteria

On September 1, 2011, the Big Ten Conference announced the divisional tiebreaker procedures that will be used to determine the representatives in the championship game. Division standings are based on each team's overall conference record, excluding teams ineligible for postseason because of sanctions.  In the event that two teams are tied, the head-to-head results between those two teams determines the tiebreaker.  Unlike the Southeastern Conference, whose rules were established before NCAA overtime and has provisions in case the two tied teams' game is either canceled or tied because of inclement weather (NCAA rules permit drawn games if, after three periods have been played, a game is tied when the game is called off because of inclement weather, including reaching curfew), the Big Ten does not have a policy in case the head-to-head result is a tie because of inclement weather.

Three or more-team tiebreaker procedure

If only two teams remain after any of the following steps, the tiebreaker will revert to the two-team tiebreaker above.

 The records of the three or more tied teams will be compared against each other.
 The records of the three or more tied teams will be compared within their division.
 The records of the three or more tied teams will be compared against the next highest placed teams in their division in order of finish (4, 5, 6, and 7).
 The records of the three or more tied teams will be compared against all common conference opponents.
 The team with the best overall winning percentage (excluding exempted games) will be the representative.
 The representative will be chosen by random draw.

See also
 List of NCAA Division I FBS conference championship games

Notes

References

 
Sports competitions in Indianapolis